The Mongolian silver vole (Alticola semicanus) is a species of rodent in the family Cricetidae.
It is found only in Mongolia.

References

Alticola
Mammals of Mongolia
Mammals described in 1924
Taxonomy articles created by Polbot